Center Point was an unincorporated community in Tarrant County, located near its border with Parker County, in the U.S. state of Texas. The area is now mainly within the areas of Azle and Briar.

References

Unincorporated communities in Tarrant County, Texas
Unincorporated communities in Texas